SRCC may refer to:

 Spearman's rank correlation coefficient
 Shri Ram College of Commerce, University of Delhi
 Santa Rosa Carib Community
 Syrian Revolutionary Command Council